Mastram is 2014 Indian Hindi-language biographical film directed by Akhilesh Jaiswal, and starring Rahul bagga and Tara Alisha Berry. The film is about an aspiring litterateur turning into an initially reluctant finally full-fledged pornographic writer, is inspired by the anonymous author of popular pulp fiction and sex stories in Hindi, only known as Mastram. These books sold at railway station stalls and small roadside and pavement shops in North India through the 1980s and 90s. Jaiswal  makes his directorial debut with the film. The film also marks the debut of actress Tara Alisha Berry. The film features rapper Yo Yo Honey Singh's Gujarati Single "Achko Machko" and is also the theme song of the movie's trailer which was released on 14 Feb 2014 by Bohra Bros on YouTube.

The film premiered at Mumbai Film Festival in October 2013, ahead of its theatrical release on 9 May 2014.

Plot
Rajaram (Rahul Bagga), a small town  bank clerk who dreams of travelling to Delhi and becoming a reputed writer. His literature aspirations  are supported by none except his naive wife Renu (Tara-Alisha Berry). He leaves his job to become a full-time writer, but cannot find a publisher for his book. One publisher agrees only if he would add sensational elements or masala to his dull tale. He is unable to decode masala until he meets Chacha, an eccentric, old village idiot who shows him the spicier side of life. He adopts the pseudonym of Mastram and churns out his publicly taboo novel series, which becomes a best selling book. He gets successful however all credits are attributed to Mastram not Rajaram.

Cast
 Rahul Bagga as Rajaram
 Tara Alisha Berry as Renu
 Vinod Nahardih 
 Istiyak Khan as Rajaram's friend
 Aakash Dahiya as Young Guy at printing press 
 Aishwarya Mehta as Bhabhi (Maakhan's wife)
 Sagar
Benieal.R

Crew
 Banner : Bohra Bros Productions
 Producer : Sanjiv Singh Pal | Ajay Rai
 Director : Akhilesh Jaiswal
 Music Director : Yo Yo Honey Singh
 Creative & Publicity Design : RDM Media
 Online Marketing : RDM Media

Filming
According to Director Akhilesh Jaiswal, the film stars some of the finest actors from NSD (National School of Drama) and other theatre groups. The Film has been shot at several places in North India including Manali.

Production
Talking about the mystery in film, director Akhilesh Jaiswal says, "My film is a fictional account of the writer’s life. Even I am curious to know who the real brain behind the book is, or the real face behind the author, as you put it". It is not a pornographic film and he hopes to get an A Certificate from Censor Board without any cuts.

Critical reception
Film critic Subhash K. Jha gave it 3 stars and said that Mastram brings a meditative melancholy to the porn writer's life. We get to meet the man behind the orgasms. We feel the pain beneath the porn.

References

External links 
Trailer on Youtube

Mastram on Bollywood Hungama

2013 films
2010s Hindi-language films
Indian erotic films
Films about writers
Indian independent films
2013 directorial debut films
Indian pornography
Films set in the 1980s
Films set in the 1990s
Indian biographical films
Hindi-language films based on actual events
Indian films based on actual events